The 1918 Norwegian Football Cup was the 17th season of the Norwegian annual knockout football tournament. The tournament was open for all members of NFF. Kvik (Fredrikshald) won their first title by beating Brann in the final. This was second consecutive year that Brann lost the final.

First round
Twenty clubs received a bye to the second round.

|}

Second round

|}

Third round

|colspan="3" style="background-color:#97DEFF"|8 September 1918

|}

Quarter-finals

|colspan="3" style="background-color:#97DEFF"|22 September 1918

|-
|colspan="3" style="background-color:#97DEFF"|Replay: 27 September 1918

|}

Semi-finals

|colspan="3" style="background-color:#97DEFF"|29 September 1918

|}

Final

See also
1918 in Norwegian football

References

Norwegian Football Cup seasons
Norway
Football Cup